Beauty Unadorned is a 1913 silent short film directed by Sidney Drew, L. Rogers Lytton and James Young. It starred Drew and Clara Kimball Young who was the wife of Young. It was produced by the Vitagraph Company of America. It survives, incomplete, in the Library of Congress collection.

Cast
Sidney Drew - Commodore Blunt
Clara Kimball Young - Helen Preston
James Young - Henry Blunt, the Commodore's Son
Ethel Lloyd - Irene Pearl Vardin
Templar Saxe - Viscount de Gagaine
L. Rogers Lytton - Undetermined
George Stevens - Matthews
William Shea - Captain Smith
Alberta Gallatin - Mrs. Preston

References

External links
Beauty Unadorned at IMDb.com

1913 films
American silent short films
Films directed by James Young
Vitagraph Studios short films
American black-and-white films
1910s American films